Richard Hodder-Williams (born 18 March 1943, Borough of Fylde, Lancashire, England) is a British Africanist, Americanist and political scientist. He studied at Rugby School (1959-1961) and Christ Church, Oxford and is an emeritus professor of politics at the University of Bristol, where he also served as a Pro-(Vice-)Chancellor. He was director of Badminton School, Bristol (1993–2008), Sherborne School, Sherborne, Dorset, England (2000–2016) and Fairfield P.N.E.U. School, Bristol (1991–1999), 
 

and president to the African Studies Association of the United Kingdom from 1996 to 1998. In 2008–2009 he was a High Sheriff of the City of Bristol.
In 2016 the African Studies Association of the UK awarded him the Distinguished Africanist Award for his contributions to African Studies in the UK.

Selected publications
 Public opinion polls and British politics, London, Routledge & K. Paul, 1970
 The politics of the US Supreme Court, London; Boston: G. Allen & Unwin, 1980
 White farmers in Rhodesia, 1890–1965: a history of the Marandellas, London: Macmillan, 1983
 Conflict in Zimbabwe: the Matabeleland problem, London, England: Institute for the Study of Conflict, 1983. Conflict studies no. 151 
 Politics in Britain and the United States: Comparative Perspectives, Richard Hodder-Williams and James W. Ceaser (eds.), Durham, NC: Duke University Press, 1986
 A Directory of Africanists in Britain, Bristol, Avon. Published on behalf of the Royal African Society by the University of Bristol, 1986
 Churchill to Major: The British Prime Ministership since 1945 by L. Borthwick, Martin Burch, and Philip Giddings. Donald Shell and Richard Hodder-Williams (eds.), Routledge, 1995
 Judges and politics in the contemporary age, London: Bowerdean, 1996
 Land-Locked States of Africa and Asia, Richard Hodder-Williams, Keith McLachlan, and Sarah J. Lloyd (eds.), 1997 
 An Introduction to the Politics of Tropical Africa, Routledge Library Editions: Development, 2010

References

External links
 
 
 

Academics of the University of Bristol
Alumni of Christ Church, Oxford
British Africanists
Living people
1943 births
Presidents of the African Studies Association of the United Kingdom